Zombie Night 2: Awakening is a  2006 Canadian horror film directed by David J. Francis and starring Sharon DeWitt, Kari Grace, and Dan Rooney.  It is a conceptual sequel to Zombie Night.  It was followed in 2008 by Reel Zombies.

Premise 
Mosquitoes spread a zombie plague, and humanity is devastated.  Denied shelter with a heavily armed group of survivors, Keith and Shelley attempt to clear out a marina and use it to escape to a better location.  Amid attacks by nocturnal zombies, the previous group begin to raid them for supplies.

Cast 
 Steve Curtis as Keith
 Sharon DeWitt as Shelley
 Dan Rooney as Basil
 Maria Ibey as Candace
 Kari Grace as Crystal
 Johnny Paris as Derek
 Bob Hillhouse as Pascal
 Nick Smith as Saul
 Lise Moule as Crazy
 Sarah-Jean Villa as Vikki
 Mark Parr as Logan
 Dana McArdle as Eli
 Jessica Pickles as Hailey
 Tony Watt as Jay
 David J. Francis as Father
 Ryan Gallant as Zombie
 John Bell as Andrew
 Corey Clarke as James & Groom Zombie
Amanda Pauls as zombie with gash across face
Brendan Mertens as Bug Zombie

Production 
Zombie Night 2: Awakening was filmed to the turn of the year in Deseronto, Ontario.  The budget was under $100,000.

Reception 
Susan Walker of The Toronto Star rated it 1.5/4 stars and wrote that it "might be enough to satisfy a loyal fan base" but is not a good film.  Ulises Silva of Quiet Earth rated it 4.5/10 stars and called it "a suspense-less, ineffective zombie film" that could have benefited from a higher budget.
Writing in The Zombie Movie Encyclopedia, Volume 2, academic Peter Dendle said, "There are at least a few interesting touches in the zombie conceptualizations here, unlike the depressing and tedious vision in the first feature."

References

External links 
 
 
 

2006 films
2006 horror films
2000s comedy horror films
Canadian comedy horror films
English-language Canadian films
2000s English-language films
Zombie comedy films
2006 comedy films
2000s Canadian films
Films about mosquitoes